Illawarra Lions is an Australian rules football club competing in the Sydney AFL league and based out of Wollongong.  The club was formerly known as Wollongong Lions, but changed their name in 2011 in response to their designated pathway area being further afield than merely the city of Wollongong.

They play their home games at North Dalton Park in Towradgi, and following the installation of lighting during the summer of 2006–07 the club hosted 3 night matches during the 2007 season which attracted encouraging crowds.
Trevor Burnett was head coach from 2008 to 2011 seasons, replacing Jason Philp after the 2007 season. Former Sydney Swans player Neil Brunton is the assistant coach. Current player/coach is Ken Ewen-Chappell

History
The club formed in 1971 as the Swans and moved to the Sydney AFL in 1989, becoming the Lions.
After winning the First Division premiership in 2004, the Lions were promoted to Sydney AFL Premier Division in 2005. They won 3 games in 2005, 4 in 2006, 3 in 2007, 3 in 2008, 4 and a draw in 2009, and 2 in 2010.

References

External links
 Profile for Illawarra Lions on Full Points Footy 

Australian rules football clubs in New South Wales
Sports teams in Wollongong
1971 establishments in Australia
Australian rules football clubs established in 1971